The 1995 Tel Aviv Open was a men's tennis tournament played on hard courts that was part of the World Series of the 1995 ATP Tour. It was played at the Israel Tennis Centers in the Tel Aviv District city of Ramat HaSharon, Israel from October 9 through October 16, 1995. Unseeded Ján Krošlák won the singles title.

Finals

Singles

 Ján Krošlák defeated  Javier Sánchez 6–3, 6–4
 It was Kroslak's only title of the year and the 1st of his career.

Doubles

 Jim Grabb /  Jared Palmer defeated  Kent Kinnear /  David Wheaton 6–4, 7–5
 It was Grabb's 3rd title of the year and the 20th of his career. It was Palmer's 3rd title of the year and the 10th of his career.

References

 
Tel Aviv Open
Tel Aviv Open
Tel Aviv Open